XHDE-FM is a radio station on 105.7 FM in Arteaga, Coahuila. It is owned by Grupo Imagen and known as La Kaliente with a grupera format.

History
XEDE-AM, originally on 1400 kHz, received its concession on April 4, 1942. It was Saltillo's second radio station, founded by Manuel Tamargo, Blas Narro and Ignacio Rodríguez and affiliated to Radio Programas de México. Initially known as La Voz de Coahuila (The Voice of Coahuila), the station was sold to businessman Enrique Martínez y Martínez. Eventually, it was sold to Alberto Jaubert, who would assemble a station cluster consisting of three radio stations and a TV station in Saltillo; by the 1970s, the concession was held by Radio Futurama, S.A. It later moved to 720 kHz and began broadcasting with 8 kW day and 250 watts night. Imagen acquired it in 2006.

In December 2011, XEDE was approved to migrate to FM as XHDE-FM 105.7.

References

Radio stations in Coahuila
Radio stations established in 1942
Mass media in Saltillo
Grupo Imagen